Corinna zu Sayn-Wittgenstein-Sayn (née Larsen; born 28 January 1965) is a German-born Danish entrepreneur.

Early life

Corinna Larsen was born on 28 January 1964 in Frankfurt, Germany to a German mother, Ingrid Sauer, and a Danish father, Finn Bønning Larsen. Her father, born in 1920 in Ballerup, Denmark, was the European Director of Varig, the national airline of Brazil, from 1961 until 1991.

Larsen is a Danish national by right of birth. She was raised in Frankfurt, Rio de Janeiro, and Switzerland, and graduated from the University of Geneva in 1987.

Career

She began her career at L'Oréal before moving on to a public relations role at Compagnie Générale des Eaux.

Boss Sporting 

From 2000 until 2006, she organized rare animal hunts at Boss Sporting, a subsidiary of the London based gun-making firm Boss & Co. It was in this capacity that she was introduced to Juan Carlos I of Spain by Gerald Grosvenor, 6th Duke of Westminster in 2004. The King of Spain subsequently hired her to arrange the honeymoon of his son Felipe, Prince of Asturias and his new bride Princess Letizia. Between 2004 and 2005, the monarch hired her to organize two hunting safaris, including an elephant hunt at the Duke of Westminster's estate in Botswana in 2012.

Apollonia Associates 

In 2006, she founded a consulting firm called Apollonia Associates that advises businesses and governments. She relocated to Monaco where she became an advisor to Princess Charlene. In 2013, Albert II, Prince of Monaco, appointed her as a global trade envoy for the principality. She is one of the people named in the Paradise papers disclosure published in the German newspaper Süddeutsche Zeitung. 

In 2012, approximately $65 million (€57 million) was allegedly transferred from an account to zu Sayn-Wittgenstein-Sayn. Zu Sayn-Wittgenstein-Sayn told investigators that the money was a donation from the former Spanish monarch, whom Swiss prosecutors name as the first beneficiary of the Mirabaud bank account. Zu Sayn-Wittgenstein-Sayn told investigators that the money paid for the refurbishment work at an Eaton Square apartment in London. These refurbishments cost around £4 million pounds (€4,340,055).

In August 2020, she was part of an investigation regarding a Saudi rail deal during the late-2010s, and a series of financial transactions involving Juan Carlos I of Spain.

During many years zu Sayn-Wittgenstein-Sayn, used several offshore societies to move the money that she received from different sources, this was to avoid to be able to get tracked in the purchase of mansions and houses in different places, the creation of these complex network based in places thousands of miles from her residence. The creation of these complicated companies or trusts facilitate to hide the real owner of properties and accounts with money.

Personal life

In 1989, she met Philip Adkins, a British businessman. They were married in 1990 and in 1992, they had a daughter, Anastasia. They were divorced in 1995. On 26 October 2000, she married Casimir, Prince zu Sayn-Wittgenstein-Sayn, twelve years her junior, in London. In 2002, she and Prince Casimir had a son, Prince Alexander Kyril. They divorced in 2005 and she retained her married name. In 2015, she purchased a home (which she reportedly told Swiss prosecutors was for her son) at Chyknell Hall at Claverley, Shropshire, where she has been resident since.

Relationship with Juan Carlos I 

She became the mistress of Spanish King Juan Carlos I in 2004. News of her relationship with the king made international headlines in April 2012. She arranged and accompanied the monarch on an elephant-hunting safari at the Duke of Westminster's estate in Botswana. The elephant-hunting trip she arranged came at an expense of €40,000 which was paid by Mohammed Eyad Kayali, advisor to the Saudi royal family, who, like zu Sayn-Wittgenstein-Sayn, was named in the 2016 Panama Papers as the head of 15 offshore companies. When the King fell, broke his hip and had to have emergency surgery, their affair was exposed via increased media scrutiny.

In 2012, King Juan Carlos transferred around €65m to her as 'a gift'.

References

1964 births
Living people
Businesspeople from Frankfurt
German people of Danish descent
Corinna
German princesses
Princesses by marriage
German philanthropists
German women philanthropists
Monegasque philanthropists
People named in the Panama Papers
Mistresses of Spanish royalty
People named in the Paradise Papers
People named in the Pandora Papers
Juan Carlos I of Spain